Martijn Koster (born ca 1970) is a Dutch software engineer noted for his pioneering work on Internet searching.

Koster created ALIWEB, the Internet's first search engine, which was announced in November 1993 while working at Nexor and presented in May 1994  at the First International Conference on the World Wide Web.  Koster also developed ArchiePlex, a search engine for FTP sites that pre-dates the Web, and CUSI, a simple tool that allowed you to search different search engines in quick succession, useful in the early days of search when services provided varying results.

Koster also created the Robots Exclusion Standard.

References

Living people
Dutch software engineers
Dutch computer scientists
1970 births